Sloanea tomentosa is a species of plant in the Elaeocarpaceae family. It is found in Bhutan, China, India, Myanmar, Nepal, and Thailand.

References

tomentosa
Trees of China
Trees of the Indian subcontinent
Trees of Myanmar
Trees of Thailand
Taxonomy articles created by Polbot